Stephen K. Guolla (born March 15, 1973) is a Canadian former professional ice hockey player who played in the National Hockey League for the San Jose Sharks, Tampa Bay Lightning, Atlanta Thrashers and the New Jersey Devils. Guolla  is a 2016 Michigan Amateur Hockey Association 30+ Recreational Division State Champion.

Playing career

He was drafted 3rd overall by the Ottawa Senators in the 1994 NHL Supplemental Draft.  In his NHL career, Guolla played 205 regular season games, scoring 40 goals and 46 assists for 86 points, collecting 60 penalty minutes.  He has spent the past seasons playing in Europe with spells in Switzerland for Kloten, Germany for the Hannover Scorpions, and in Finland for HIFK. His last playing year was 2010-11 with Tappara in the Finnish SM-liiga.

Career statistics

Championships

2016 Michigan Amateur Hockey Association 30+ Recreational Division State Champions

Awards and honours

References

External links
 

1973 births
Albany River Rats players
Atlanta Thrashers players
Canadian expatriate ice hockey players in Finland
Canadian expatriate ice hockey players in Germany
Canadian ice hockey centres
Hannover Scorpions players
HC TWK Innsbruck players
HIFK (ice hockey) players
Kentucky Thoroughblades players
EHC Kloten players
Living people
Michigan State Spartans men's ice hockey players
National Hockey League supplemental draft picks
New Jersey Devils players
Ottawa Senators draft picks
Prince Edward Island Senators players
San Jose Sharks players
Sportspeople from Scarborough, Toronto
Ice hockey people from Toronto
Tampa Bay Lightning players
Tappara players
AHCA Division I men's ice hockey All-Americans